Wild camping or dispersed camping is the act of camping in areas other than designated camping sites. Typically this means open countryside. This can form part of backpacking (hiking), or bikepacking, possibly along a long-distance trail.

Countries

United States 

Dispersed camping is the term given to camping in the United States on public land other than in designated campsites. This type of camping is most common on national forest and Bureau of Land Management land.

United Kingdom 

Although land access for outdoor recreation was improved in England and Wales with the introduction of the Countryside and Rights of Way Act 2000, there is still no assumed right to camp in open countryside without the landowner's permission. There are however certain areas where it has traditionally been tolerated, such as Dartmoor National Park.

In Scotland, following the Land Reform (Scotland) Act 2003, people may camp on most unenclosed land, whether state or privately owned, provided they adhere to the Scottish Outdoor Access Code.

Canada 

Camping outside of designated campsites is generally not permitted in national parks, provincial parks and cities in Canada. However it is typically allowed on crown land, which covers 89% of the country. Regulations for camping on crown land vary by province, for example Ontario, Quebec, British Columbia.

Australia 

In Australia, wild camping may be referred to as "bush camping". The regulations differ by state, but, for example, in New South Wales some national parks permit bush camping.

New Zealand 

Relevant legislation in New Zealand includes the Freedom Camping Act 2011 and the subsequent updated guidance for local authorities which states "freedom camping is permitted everywhere in a local authority area unless it is prohibited or restricted in accordance with a by-law".

Sweden 

In Sweden, a right of public access – allowing outdoor recreational activity on privately held wilderness – is enshrined in the constitution.

See also

 Freedom to roam

References

Camping